Qasemabad-e Sofla (also Romanized as Qāsemābād-e Soflá; also known as Qāsem Ābād and Qāsemābād-e Pā’īn) is a village in Owshiyan Rural District, Chaboksar District, Rudsar County, Gilan Province, Iran. At the 2006 census, its population was 2,667, in 763 families.

References 

Populated places in Rudsar County